Nurym Dyusenov (born 17 November 1969) is a Kazakhstani wrestler. He competed in the men's Greco-Roman 52 kg at the 1996 Summer Olympics.

References

External links
 

1969 births
Living people
Kazakhstani male sport wrestlers
Olympic wrestlers of Kazakhstan
Wrestlers at the 1996 Summer Olympics
Place of birth missing (living people)
Wrestlers at the 1998 Asian Games
Asian Games competitors for Kazakhstan
20th-century Kazakhstani people
21st-century Kazakhstani people